Italo Pacchioni (29 March 1872 – 11 July 1940) was an Italian inventor, photographer and filmmaker, pioneer of Italian cinema, inventor of a camera and projector inspired by the cinematograph of Auguste and Louis Lumière.

Biography
Italo Pacchioni was born on 29 March 1872, in Mirandola. In 1896, he witnessed the first public screenings of the Lumière brothers in Paris where he wrote down and memorized the detailed operation of the Lumière cinematograph. With the help of his brother Enrico and a mechanic whose surname is only known, Veronelli, he assembled a camera and projector similar to the cinematograph of Auguste and Louis Lumière.

After the first screening performed on 31 October 1896 in Mirandola, Italo Pacchioni toured Italy with his invention and proposed 45-minute shows, unlike those of the Lumière which lasted no more than 25 minutes. The tour included 10, 15, at times even 20 films, depending on the amount of the paying audience. The sound consisted of improvised musical groups, there were no captions and, if necessary, the titles were shouted from the projection booth.

The pioneer abandoned all cinematographic activities in 1902. He then opened a photographic studio in Milan, and later opened two others, one in Busto Arsizio and one in Abbiategrasso. He died on 11 July 1940, in Milan.

Filmography 

1896: Arrivo del treno alla Stazione di Milano
1896: Ballo in famiglia
1896: La battaglia di neve
1896: Le gabbie dei matti
1896: Il finto storpio al Castello Sforzesco
1898: La Fiera di Porta Genova
1898: Il vecchio Verziere
1898: I ginnasti della Mediolanum
1899: Il Re Umberto I in visita alla Marina
1900: I funerali di Umberto I
1901: I funerali di Giuseppe Verdi

See also 
 Cinema of Italy
 Lumière brothers

Notes

External links 

 
 
 

Italian filmmakers
19th-century Italian inventors
Cinema pioneers
1872 births
1940 deaths